Éric Alauzet (born 7 June 1958) is a French politician of Renaissance (RE) who has been serving as a member of the National Assembly since the 2012 elections, representing the 2nd constituency of the department of Doubs.

Political career
During his first term in the National Assembly from 2012 until 2017, Alauzet served on the Finance Committee. On 19 May 2016, together with five other MPs, he left the Green Group, causing its dissolution, and joined the Socialists' parliamentary group.

In the Socialist Party's primaries ahead of the 2017 presidential elections, Alauzet endorsed François de Rugy, even though his party had already nominated Yannick Jadot as its official candidate. Once Benoît Hamon was selected as the Socialist Party's candidate, however, he decided to support Emmanuel Macron instead.

Following the 2017 legislative elections, Alauzet joined the Finance Committee again. In 2019 he moved to the Committee on Sustainable Development and Spatial Planning. In addition to his committee assignments, he is a member of the French-Chinese Parliamentary Friendship Group.

In 2020, Alauzet joined En commun (EC), a group within LREM led by Barbara Pompili.

Political positions
In October 2017, Alauzet joined forces with Blandine Brocard to call for a moratorium on the government's plans for extending vaccination requirements for young children.

In July 2019, Alauzet voted against the ratification of the Comprehensive Economic and Trade Agreement (CETA), arguing that it "does not make it possible to respond to current issues, first and foremost the climate and biodiversity."

See also
 2017 French legislative election

References

1958 births
Living people
Politicians from Nancy, France
Europe Ecology – The Greens politicians
La République En Marche! politicians
Territories of Progress politicians
Deputies of the 14th National Assembly of the French Fifth Republic
Deputies of the 15th National Assembly of the French Fifth Republic
Deputies of the 16th National Assembly of the French Fifth Republic